Penetrate the Satanic Citizen is a Leæther Strip compilation album released by Re-Constriction Records in October 1992. Together with Fit for Flogging, the album bundles most of Leæther Strip's releases prior to Solitary Confinement.

Track listing

Personnel
Adapted from the Penetrate the Satanic Citizen liner notes.

 Claus Larsen – lead vocals, arrangements, production, mixing

Release history

References

External links 
 
 

1992 compilation albums
Leæther Strip compilation albums
Re-Constriction Records compilation albums